Oznobishino is the name of several rural localities in Russia:
Oznobishino, Moscow, a selo in Shchapovskoye Settlement of Troitsky Administrative Okrug in the federal city of Moscow
Oznobishino, Nizhny Novgorod Oblast, a village in Veryakushsky Selsoviet of Diveyevsky District in Nizhny Novgorod Oblast; 
Oznobishino, Vladimir Oblast, a village in Selivanovsky District of Vladimir Oblast